Beşiktaş's men's basketball department were founded in 1933, before being halted in 1936, and then resuming once again in 1940. Since then, Beşiktaş have played in the Turkish Basketball Super League, in every season, except in the 1988–89 season, due to their relegation to the Turkish Basketball First League after the 1987–88 season. The club won the Turkish Super League, under the management of Ateş Çubukçu and Tom Davis, in the 1974–75 season.

The men's basketball department of Fenerbahçe were founded in 1913 and achieved considerable success when the sport established itself in Turkey. Fenerbahçe won national championship titles in 1957, 1959 and 1965, just before the Turkish League was founded in 1966, and participated in the European Champions Cup in 1960 and 1966. Their fans had to wait until 1991 for another title, when Levent Topsakal, Larry Richard and head coach Çetin Yılmaz led Fenerbahçe to the Turkish League title over Tofaş.

Honours

Head to head
As of 28 January 2021

Sponsorship naming
Due to sponsorship deals, Fenerbahçe and Beşiktaş have been also known as:

 Fenerbahçe Ülker: 2006–2015
 Fenerbahçe Doğuş: 2017–18
 Fenerbahçe Beko: 2018–

 Beşiktaş Cola Turka: 2005–2011
 Beşiktaş Milangaz: 2011–2012
 Beşiktaş Integral Forex: 2013–2015
 Beşiktaş Sompo Japan: 2015–2020
Beşiktaş Icrypex: 2021–present

Turkish League matches

Turkish Cup matches

European competitions

See also
The Intercontinental Derby
Beşiktaş–Galatasaray rivalry

References

Fenerbahçe Men's Basketball
Turkish Basketball Super League teams
Basketball rivalries